Nalisha Kumari A Patel (born 18 March 1998) is an English cricketer who last played for Cheshire in 2019. She plays as a right-arm off break bowler. She has also played for Lancashire, as well as Lancashire Thunder in the Women's Cricket Super League.

Early life
Patel was born on 18 March 1998 in Bolton, Greater Manchester.

Domestic career
Patel made her county debut in 2012, for Lancashire against Worcestershire, in which she took 5/6 from 6.2 overs. In 2014, she was her side's leading wicket-taker in the County Championship, with 13 wickets at an average of 12.15. In 2016, she helped her side to promotion to Division 1 of the County Championship, and took 8 wickets at an average of 7.12. A season later, she was part of the Lancashire side that won the County Championship and Twenty20 Cup double.

In 2019, Patel appeared in four matches in the Twenty20 Cup for Cheshire, taking 2 wickets at an average of 38.50.

Patel also played one match for Lancashire Thunder in the 2016 Women's Cricket Super League, against Yorkshire Diamonds, in which she did not bowl and was dismissed first ball.

She also played in the 2013 Super Fours, for Sapphires.

References

External links

1998 births
Living people
Lancashire women cricketers
Cheshire women cricketers
Lancashire Thunder cricketers